Teun Bijleveld (born 27 May 1998) is a Dutch professional footballer who plays as a midfielder for Eerste Divisie club Roda JC.

Club career

Early years
Bijleveld played youth football for SV Ouderkerk and AZ. He signed his first contract with AZ on 21 December 2014, keeping him at the club until 2017. He was part of the Jong AZ team winning the Tweede Divisie in 2016–17.

On 15 June 2017, Bijleveld joined Ajax on a two-year deal, and was added to their reserves Jong Ajax competing in the second-tier Eerste Divisie. He made his professional debut for Jong Ajax on 18 August 2017 in a 2–1 away win over Cambuur. On 25 September 2017, Bijleveld scored his first professional goal, helping his team to a 1–1 home draw against Telstar. Jong Ajax won the Eerste Divisie title in the 2017–18 season, but could, however, not win promotion due to Dutch league rules.

Heracles Almelo
On 21 June 2019, Bijleveld signed a two-year contract with Eredivisie club Heracles Almelo. He made his debut in the Eredivisie for Heracles on 4 August 2019, replacing Adrián Szőke in the 74th minute of a 4–0 home loss to Heerenveen. Bijleveld made 17 total appearances during the 2019–20 season, of which only two as a starter.

He was more involved in the 2020–21 season, making 22 appearances of which 13 as a starter. He lost his starting spot at the end of the season, and without making a decisive impact for Heracles, he left the club as a free agent as his contract expired in June 2021.

Emmen
On 7 July 2021, Bijleveld joined Eerste Divisie club Emmen on a two-year contract. He made his debut for the club on 6 August 2021, the first matchday of the 2021–22 season, starting in a 1–1 away draw against Telstar. He would also fail to make an impact for Emmen, making only two starts that season in 13 total appearances. Emmen won the Eerste Divisie title that season, winning promotion back to the Eredivisie.

He left the club before the start of the new season, as the two parties mutually agreed to a contract termination.

Roda JC
On 30 August 2022, Bijleveld signed a two-year contract with Eerste Divisie club Roda JC. He made his Roda debut on 4 September 2022 in a Limburg derby against MVV, starting in a 1–1 draw. On 11 December 2022, Bijleveld scored his first goal for the club, as well as his first competive goal in more than four years, opening the score in a 3–1 home loss to his former club Heracles.

International career
Bijleveld is a youth international for the Netherlands, having gained 28 caps at different youth levels.

Career statistics

Honours
Jong AZ
 Tweede Divisie: 2016–17

Jong Ajax
 Eerste Divisie: 2017–18

Emmen
 Eerste Divisie: 2021–22

References

External links
 

Living people
1998 births
Sportspeople from Amstelveen
Association football midfielders
Dutch footballers
Netherlands youth international footballers
Eredivisie players
Eerste Divisie players
Tweede Divisie players
Jong AZ players
Jong Ajax players
Heracles Almelo players
FC Emmen players
Roda JC Kerkrade players
Footballers from North Holland